Karnataka State Film Award for Best Female Playback Singer is a state film award of the Indian state of Karnataka  given during the annual Karnataka State Film Awards. The award honours female singers for their work Kannada language films.

Superlative Winners

Award winners
The following is a complete list of award winners and the name of the films for which they won.

See also
 Cinema of Karnataka
 List of Kannada-language films

References

Karnataka State Film Awards
Kannada-language films
1988 establishments in Karnataka
Music awards honoring women